is a Japanese martial artist and kickboxer. He competes in ONE Championship's bantamweight and flyweight division, where he is the former ONE Kickboxing Bantamweight World Champion.

As of June 2022, he is ranked as the second-best featherweight kickboxer in the world by Combat Press. He's been ranked in the top ten since December 2021. As of November 24, 2022, he is ranked #1 in the ONE Bantamweight Kickboxing rankings.

Background 
Japanese-born Akimoto began his martial arts journey at the age of eight. He took up full contact karate and became a top talent over his years of training. Both of his parents were instructors in the Shichishu-Kai, but he was never forced to participate. It was not until he was involved in a fight at school did he decide to take up martial arts.

As his skills grew, he turned to competition. He did not stick with karate, and also competed in Muay Thai and kickboxing bouts. To get the most of his talents, Akimoto moved from Japan to Singapore to train at Evolve MMA and pursue a world title in ONE Championship.

Kickboxing career 
Akimoto got off to an incredible start to his professional career. He racked up 19 straight kickboxing victories that would lead him to be signed by ONE Championship.

ONE Championship

Early promotional career
Akimoto made his organizational debut with ONE Championship on January 25, 2019 at ONE Championship: Hero's Ascent. It was his first kickboxing bout in nearly six years. Akimoto won the fight by unanimous decision.

The now 20–0 striker returned to competition on March 31, 2019 at ONE Championship: A New Era against Joseph Lasiri. Akimoto lost the bout by majority decision, suffering the first loss of his professional career.

Akimoto faced Kenny Tse at ONE Championship: Masters Of Destiny on July 12, 2019. He won the fight by unanimous decision, successfully rebounding from his loss to Lasiri.

Move to Bantamweight
Akimoto faced Zhang Chenglong at ONE Championship: Reign of Dynasties 2 on October 17, 2020. He won the fight by split decision. Due to the close decision, the pair were immediately booked for a rematch at ONE Championship: Fists Of Fury on February 26, 2021. Akimoto was more convincing in the rematch, as he beat Zhang by unanimous decision.

Akimoto faced former Wu Lin Feng kickboxing champion Qiu Jianliang at ONE: Winter Warriors on December 3, 2021. He won the bout via unanimous decision.

Bantamweight kickboxing champion
Akimoto (then the #2 ONE Kickboxing Bantamweight contender) challenged the reigning ONE Bantamweight kickboxing champion Capitan Petchyindee Academy at ONE: X on March 25, 2022. He won the fight by unanimous decision, after controlling the final four rounds of the bout. Capitan was twice warned for illegal clinching and was deducted a point for it in the fourth round. Akimoto was given the $50,000 Performance of the Night award as well, and was named the March 2022 "Fighter of the Month" by eFight.

Akimoto made his first ONE Bantamweight Kickboxing World title defense against #4 ranked contender Petchtanong Petchfergus at ONE 163 on November 18, 2022. He lost the fight by split decision (and also his second loss on his kickboxing career).

Titles and accomplishments

Kickboxing
Amateur
Martial Arts Japan Kickboxing Federation
 2008 MAJKF All Japan Tournament Bantamweight Winner & event MVP
K-1
 2010 K-1 Koshien Tournament Runner-up

Professional
ONE Championship
ONE Bantamweight Kickboxing World Championship (One time) 
Performance of the Night (One time)  
MA Japan Kickboxing Federation
2012 MAJKF Featherweight Champion
WBC Muay Thai
2012 WBC Muay Thai Japan Featherweight Champion
Awards
eFight.jp
2x Fighter of the Month (October 2012, March 2022)
Beyond Kickboxing
2022 Beyond Kick "Fight of the Year"

Karate
Japan Karate Judge Organization
 2005 JKJO Karate-Do MAC Japan Cup Middle School -40kg runner-up
 2006 JKJO Karate-Do MAC Japan Cup Middle School -50kg runner-up
 2007 JKJO Karate-Do MAC Japan Cup Middle School -40kg runner-up
 2007 JKJO All Japan Junior Championship Middle School -55kg runner-up

Japanese Fullcontact Karate Organization
2015 JFKO All Japan Full Contact Championship Lightweight Runner-up
2016 JFKO All Japan Full Contact Championship Lightweight 3rd Place
2017 JFKO All Japan Full Contact Championship Lightweight Champion

Kyokushin World Federation
2016 KWF Russian Open Lightweight 1st Place
2017 KWF Karate Grand Prix Lightweight Champion
2017 KWF Karate European Championship 70 kg 3rd Place
2018 KWF Karate Grand Prix Lightweight Runner-up

Professional Kyokushin
World Fighting Kyokushin Organization
2018 WFKO World Pro Kyokushin -65kg Champion

Fight record

|-  style="background:#fbb;"
| 2022-11-19 || Loss ||align=left| Petchtanong Petchfergus || ONE 163 || Kallang, Singapore || Decision (Split) ||  5|| 3:00
|-
! style=background:white colspan=9 |
|-  style="background:#CCFFCC;"
| 2022-03-26|| Win ||align=left| Capitan Petchyindee Academy || ONE: X || Kallang, Singapore || Decision (Unanimous) || 5 || 3:00  
|-
! style=background:white colspan=9 |
|- style="background:#CCFFCC;"
| 2021-12-03|| Win ||align=left| Qiu Jianliang || ONE: Winter Warriors || Kallang, Singapore || Decision (Unanimous) || 3 || 3:00
|-  style="background:#cfc;"
| 2021-02-26|| Win||align=left| Zhang Chenglong || ONE Championship: Fists Of Fury || Kallang, Singapore || Decision (Unanimous)  || 3 || 3:00
|- style="background:#CCFFCC;"
| 2020-10-17|| Win ||align=left| Zhang Chenglong || ONE Championship: Reign of Dynasties 2 || Kallang, Singapore || Decision (Split) || 3 ||3:00
|- style="background:#CCFFCC;"
| 2019-07-12|| Win ||align=left| Kenny Tse || ONE Championship: Masters Of Destiny || Kuala Lumpur, Malaysia || Decision (Unanimous) || 3 ||3:00
|- style="background:#fbb;"
| 2019-03-31|| Loss ||align=left| Joseph Lasiri || ONE Championship: A New Era || Tokyo, Japan || Decision (Majority) || 3 ||3:00
|- style="background:#CCFFCC;"
| 2019-01-25|| Win ||align=left| Josh Tonna || ONE Championship: Hero's Ascent || Pasay, Philippines || Decision (Unanimous) || 3 ||3:00
|- style="background:#CCFFCC;"
| 2013-04-14|| Win ||align=left| Surachai Sisuriyanyothin || MAJKF DRAGON ROAD ONE AND ONLY TAKE 1 || Kanagawa Prefecture, Japan || Decision (Unanimous) || 5 ||3:00
|- style="background:#CCFFCC;"
| 2012-12-02|| Win ||align=left| Shunta|| BigBang 11 || Tokyo, Japan || Decision (Unanimous) || 5 ||3:00
|- style="background:#CCFFCC;"
| 2012-10-07|| Win ||align=left| Yosuke Morii || MAJKF BREAK-30 ～UNIFICATION～ || Tokyo, Japan || Decision (Unanimous) || 5 ||3:00 
|-
! style=background:white colspan=9 |
|- style="background:#CCFFCC;"
| 2012-07-15|| Win ||align=left| Daiki Fujisawa|| MAJKF KICK GUTS 2012 || Tokyo, Japan || TKO (Doctor Stoppage/Left Elbow) || 1 || 1:28 
|-
! style=background:white colspan=9 |
|- style="background:#CCFFCC;"
| 2012-05-06|| Win ||align=left| Kenryu|| MAJKF BREAK-25 ～CANNONBALL～ || Tokyo, Japan || KO (Right Front Kick) || 1 || 2:52
|- style="background:#CCFFCC;"
| 2012-02-25|| Win ||align=left| Fumiya Sasaki|| BigBang 8 || Tokyo, Japan || KO (Left High Kick) || 1 || 2:40
|- style="background:#CCFFCC;"
| 2011-08-21|| Win ||align=left| Atsushi Masukura|| BigBang 6 || Tokyo, Japan || KO (High Knee)|| 3 || 0:18
|- style="background:#CCFFCC;"
| 2011-07-24|| Win ||align=left| Pinsiam Sor.Amnuaysirichoke || MAJKF J-1 time ～signal of start～|| Aichi Prefecture, Japan || KO (Left hook to the body)|| 2 || 0:54
|- style="background:#CCFFCC;"
| 2011-05-15|| Win ||align=left| Shota|| BigBang 5 || Tokyo, Japan || KO (Left Knee)|| 1 || 1:46
|- style="background:#CCFFCC;"
| 2011-02-05|| Win ||align=left| TURBO|| BigBang 4 || Tokyo, Japan || KO (Flying Knee)|| 2 || 1:05
|- style="background:#CCFFCC;"
| 2010-09-23|| Win ||align=left| Seidou Yamaguchi|| BigBang 3 || Tokyo, Japan || Decision (Unanimous) || 3 || 3:00
|- style="background:#CCFFCC;"
| 2010-05-04|| Win ||align=left| Kyoji Bancho|| MAJKF Explosion-1 || Japan || Decision (Unanimous) || 3 || 3:00
|- style="background:#CCFFCC;"
| 2010-04-04|| Win ||align=left| Toshiya Sudou|| MAJKF Boukohyouga Sono Ichi || Chiba, Japan || TKO (Corner Stoppage) || 2 || 1:17
|- style="background:#CCFFCC;"
| 2010-03-14|| Win ||align=left| Tadashi Matsumoto|| NAGOYA KICK ～CENTRAL RHYTHM～ || Chiba, Japan || Decision (Unanimous) || 3 || 3:00
|- style="background:#CCFFCC;"
| 2010-01-31|| Win ||align=left| Shoya Suzuki|| NAGOYA KICK ～KICK Hopping！～ || Nagoya, Japan || Decision (Unanimous) || 3 || 3:00
|- style="background:#CCFFCC;"
| 2009-03-08|| Win ||align=left| Masayuki Ishibashi|| NAGOYA KICK 〜Boogie Fight 07 Black Sunday〜 || Nagoya, Japan || Decision (Majority) || 3 || 3:00
|- style="background:#CCFFCC;"
| 2008-12-23|| Win ||align=left| Norifumi Yamamura|| NAGOYA KICK ～2008 FINAL Nagoya vs Muay Thai Drum Roll Please!!～ || Nagoya, Japan || Decision (Unanimous) || 3 || 3:00
|- style="background:#CCFFCC;"
| 2008-10-19|| Win ||align=left| Shin Takashiro|| MAJKF BREAK THROUGH-7 ～CHAMPION CARNIVAL～ || Tokyo, Japan || KO (Knee)|| 3 || 0:43
|- style="background:#CCFFCC;"
| 2008-08-29|| Win ||align=left| Mutsuki Ebata || K-1 Koshien -KING OF UNDER 18-  || Tokyo, Japan || Decision (Unanimous) || 3 || 3:00
|- style="background:#CCFFCC;"
| 2008-08|| Win ||align=left| Yokdam||  || Thailand || KO  || 1 ||
|-
| colspan=9 | Legend:    

|-  style="background:#FFBBBB;"
| 2010-11-20|| Loss || align=left| Shoei Hareyama ||  K-1 Koshien -KING OF UNDER 18- FINAL, Final|| Tokyo, Japan || KO (Low Kick)|| 3 ||0:23
|-
! style=background:white colspan=9 |
|- style="background:#CCFFCC;"
| 2010-11-20|| Win ||align=left| Keigo Ishida|| K-1 Koshien -KING OF UNDER 18- FINAL, Semi Final || Tokyo, Japan || KO (Left middle kick) || 4 ||
|- style="background:#CCFFCC;"
| 2010-11-20|| Win ||align=left| Sho Ogawa|| K-1 Koshien -KING OF UNDER 18- FINAL, Quarter Final || Tokyo, Japan || Ext.R Decision (Unanimous) || 4 ||
|- style="background:#CCFFCC;"
| 2010-11-20|| Win ||align=left| Koji Kashimura|| K-1 Koshien -KING OF UNDER 18- FINAL, Second Round || Tokyo, Japan || KO || 1 ||
|- style="background:#CCFFCC;"
| 2010-11-20|| Win ||align=left| Yuki Kurihara || K-1 Koshien -KING OF UNDER 18- FINAL, First Round || Tokyo, Japan || TKO || 1 ||
|- style="background:#FFBBBB;"
| 2009-10-26|| Loss ||align=left| Shota Shimada || K-1 World MAX 2009 World Championship Tournament Final K-1 Koshien Tournament Quarter Final || Tokyo, Japan || Decision || 3 || 2:00
|- style="background:#CCFFCC;"
| 2009-08-10|| Win ||align=left| Hiroto Yamaguchi || K-1 Koshien 2009 KING OF UNDER 18 -FINAL16- || Tokyo, Japan || Decision || 3 || 2:00
|- style="background:#CCFFCC;"
| 2009-07-04|| Win ||align=left| Sho Ogawa || K-1 Koshien 2009 Chubu Region Selection Tournament, Final || Japan || Ext.R Decision || 2 ||2:00
|- style="background:#CCFFCC;"
| 2009-07-04|| Win ||align=left| Hiroto Iwasaki || K-1 Koshien 2009 Chubu Region Selection Tournament, Semi Finals || Japan || Decision || 1 ||2:00
|- style="background:#CCFFCC;"
| 2009-07-04|| Win ||align=left| Hideaki Ishida || K-1 Koshien 2009 Chubu Region Selection Tournament, Quarter Finals || Japan || Decision || 1 ||2:00
|- style="background:#CCFFCC;"
| 2009-07-04|| Win ||align=left| Shunsuke Okuno || K-1 Koshien 2009 Chubu Region Selection Tournament, First Round || Japan || KO (Knee to the Body)|| 1 ||

|- style="background:#CCFFCC;"
| 2008-07-27|| Win ||align=left| Ryota Terada || 2008 MAJKF Amateur All Japan Tournament, Final || Fuefuki, Japan || || ||
|-
! style=background:white colspan=9 |

|- style="background:#CCFFCC;"
| 2008-04-29|| Win ||align=left| Yuki Miwa || MAJKF "BREAK THROUGH-3" || Tokyo, Japan || Decision (Unanimous)||2 ||2:00

|- bgcolor="#CCFFCC"
| 2007-10-28 || Win||align=left| Yuji Morihira || 6th BRIDGE one match challenge || Tokyo, Japan || Decision || 2 || 3:00 
|-
| colspan=9 | Legend:

See also 

 List of current ONE fighters

References

External links
ONE Championship profile
Shichishu-kai profile

1992 births
Living people
Japanese male kickboxers
Japanese male karateka
Kyokushin kaikan practitioners
Featherweight kickboxers
Lightweight kickboxers
People from Toyota, Aichi
Sportspeople from Aichi Prefecture
ONE Championship kickboxers
Kickboxing champions
ONE Championship champions